Adam Rizwee is a Maldivian film actor.

Career
In 2014, Rizwee made his film debut in the Aishath Fuad Thaufeeg directed art film Hulhudhaan in a minor role. In 2015 he was cast in Ali Shifau-directed romantic film Emme Fahu Vindha Jehendhen as a doctor, alongside Mohamed Jumayyil and Mariyam Majudha. The film, narrating the struggle and challenges a happily married couple undergo, was the highest grossing Maldivian film of the year, and was a critical success. 
 The following year he starred in another Dark Rain Entertainment's production, the Ali Shifau-directed romantic comedy Vaashey Mashaa Ekee (2016) opposite Mohamed Jumayyil and Mariyam Majudha narrating the life of a happily married couple being separated due to the husband's crippling fear of commitment on his wife's pregnancy. His performance in the film fetched him a nomination as the Best Supporting Actor at the 8th Gaumee Film Awards ceremony.

In 2017, Rizwee featured in the Ali Shifau-directed romantic comedy Mee Loaybakee alongside Mohamed Jumayyil and Mariyam Azza. The film, which is considered to include the largest cast in a Maldivian feature film, narrates the story of two ex-lovers sliding into the friend zone with the envy and diffidence they experience amidst a convoluted love-triangle. The film and his performance received mainly positive reviews from critics where Aishath Maaha of Avas called his acting to be "good overall".
 The film emerged as one of the highest grossing Maldivian films of 2017.

In 2019 Rizwee was one of the two main actors in the Maldivian super hit comedy film Maamui. This film is the most colossal movie Dark Rain Entertainment has produced to this date. Maamui is directed by Ali Shifau. Produced by Mohamed Ali and Aishath Fuad Thaufeeq, the film stars Sheela Najeeb, Mohamed Jumayyil, Mariyam Azza, Mariyam Majudha, Ismail Jumaih, Abdullah Shafiu Ibrahim and Nuzuhath Shuaib in pivotal roles. The film was released on 1 July 2019.

Later that year Rizwee appeared in the hit studio-based comedy series "The Kaatey Show" produced by Television Maldives alongside Abdullah Shafiu Ibrahim, which became the most viewed programme of that year's Ramadan.

Filmography

Feature film

Television

Accolades

References 

Living people
People from Malé
21st-century Maldivian male actors
Maldivian male film actors
1991 births